The Federal Reserve Bank of Kansas Oklahoma City Branch is one of the 3 branches of the Federal Reserve Bank of Kansas City.
The branch which is in Oklahoma City opened on August 2, 1920 at the Continental Building before moving in 1923 to a new building at the corner Harvey and Third streets.

Current Board of Directors
The following people are on the board of directors as of 2013:

Appointed by the Federal Reserve Bank

Appointed by the Board of Governors

See also

 Federal Reserve Act
 Federal Reserve System
 Federal Reserve Bank
 Federal Reserve Districts
 Federal Reserve Branches
 Federal Reserve Bank of Kansas City
 Federal Reserve Bank of Kansas City Denver Branch
 Federal Reserve Bank of Kansas City Omaha Branch
 Structure of the Federal Reserve System

References

Federal Reserve branches
Federal Reserve Bank of Kansas City